Cardiff South is a suburb of the City of Lake Macquarie, New South Wales, Australia, located  west-southwest of Newcastle's central business district. It is part of the City of Lake Macquarie north ward.

Cardiff South was originally composed of three separate suburbs: Cardiff South, Evelien, and Coalbrook.

Its soccer team, the South Cardiff Gunners play in the NBN State Football League, the top soccer competition in Newcastle.

References

External links
 History of Cardiff South (Lake Macquarie City Library)

Suburbs of Lake Macquarie